South Quay Plaza is a residential-led development under construction in Canary Wharf on the Isle of Dogs, London, within the borough of Tower Hamlets, developed by Berkeley Group Holdings and designed by architect Foster + Partners. The site of the development lies to the immediate north of Marsh Wall and to the immediate south of the financial district Canary Wharf. The entire development is scheduled for completion in 2028.

The development includes three towers, of which the tallest, Hampton Tower, will reach a height of 214.5 m (704 ft); making it the second-tallest residential skyscraper currently proposed for London. There will also be new public and retail space, cafés and restaurants as part of the scheme.

The new development will replace three office and retail buildings on the site which were built in the 1980s. Foundation works began following the demolition of the previous buildings on the site.

Site history 
The scheme is located in one of the first areas of any significance along Marsh Wall to be developed. South Quay 1 was constructed in 1986 and occupied by the Daily Telegraph, until the Telegraph's offices were moved to nearby Canary Wharf. The building then lay empty for some time; South Quay 1 was followed by South Quay 2 and then South Quay 3. For a time in the early 1990s, these office buildings dominated the area around Marsh Wall, until an IRA bombing in early 1996 eventually led to the demolition of the original South Quay 1. Although originally also scheduled for demolition, South Quay 2 was instead rebuilt and returned to use until the Berkeley scheme demolished it. South Quay 3 (189 Marsh Wall) was re-skinned after the bomb and renamed Wyndham House, then renamed again to South Quay Building.

 To make way for the new development, three buildings of two, three and ten storeys used for offices and retail were demolished. The 15-storey South Quay Building was instead kept and refurbished.

Design and development 
In April 2014, Berkeley obtained the South Quay Plaza buildings and site. They had already developed plans in 2013 for two residential buildings of 73 and 36 storeys. However, the taller of the two buildings, Hampton Tower, was considered too tall for the area. As a result, it was reduced in height to 68 floors and 214.5 m (704 ft). The smaller building, Berwick Tower, remained unchanged at 115.2 m (378 ft) tall.

Planning permission was granted for the development by councillors at Tower Hamlets Council in November 2014. In April 2015, the scheme received approval from the then-Mayor of London Boris Johnson, meaning the development could go ahead.

In 2015, Berkeley announced they are planning to build a third tower next door to South Quay Plaza, but will form part of the same development. Despite being recommended for approval by planning officers, it was initially rejected by Tower Hamlets council on 12 May 2016, before being granted planning permission on 28 July 2016.

In total, the development will provide 1,338 residential apartments, 6,000 sq m of new outdoor public space as well as cafés and restaurants.

Construction 
There will be three phases of development. Phase One, consisting of 68-storey Hampton Tower, began in October 2016 and has been completed in mid-2021. It saw the demolition of the current buildings to prepare for the largest of the three towers.

Phase Two, consisting of 56-storey Harcourt Gardens, began in 2020 on a neighbouring site and is currently scheduled for completion in 2024.

Originally slated to began in 2018 and scheduled for completion in 2022 as part of Phase Two, the construction of 36-storey Berwick Tower is now part of Phase Three. Existing site demolition and ground works has yet to begin.

In July 2015, construction company Laing O'Rourke won the contract to build the largest and smallest of the three buildings.

Development phases

Location 

South Quay Plaza is located at 183-189 Marsh Wall, South Quay, within the London borough of Tower Hamlets. The development is to the south of Canary Wharf and will overlook the South Dock which lies to the immediate north. The nearest station is South Quay DLR, and the closest London Underground station is Canary Wharf.

See also 
List of tallest buildings and structures in London
List of tallest buildings in the United Kingdom

References

External links 
 Official website for South Quay Plaza

Canary Wharf buildings
Buildings and structures in the London Borough of Tower Hamlets
Millwall
Proposed skyscrapers in London
Skyscrapers in the London Borough of Tower Hamlets